Marharyta Tverdokhlib (born 2 June 1991 in Poltava) is a Ukrainian long jumper.

Career
She competed in the long jump event at the 2012 Summer Olympics.

In November 2016, it was announced retests of the samples taken from the 2012 Olympics indicated that Tverdokhlib had tested positive for prohibited substances. The IOC Disciplinary Commission disqualified Tverdokhlib from the Olympic Games 2012.

In May 2017, she was disqualified for two years.

Competition record

External links 

 
 Profile at Sports-Reference.com

References

Sportspeople from Poltava
Ukrainian female long jumpers
1991 births
Living people
Olympic athletes of Ukraine
Athletes (track and field) at the 2012 Summer Olympics
Doping cases in athletics
Ukrainian sportspeople in doping cases
21st-century Ukrainian women